The Castanhão Dam is a dam in the state of Ceará, Brazil. It is the largest multiple use reservoir in the country, the largest on an intermittent river, and the main reservoir for the state and the metropolitan region of Fortaleza. The dam supplies drinking water, and supports industry, irrigation and fish farming. Through steady release of water the dam maintains water flow in the Jaguaribe River throughout the year. During 2012–16 Ceará experienced a prolonged drought. Water levels in the reservoir dropped to 5% of capacity and usage had to be rationed.

Technical

The Castanhão dam is in the municipality of Alto Santo, Ceará.
The reservoir covers parts of the municipalities of Alto Santo, Jaguaribara, Jaguaribe and Jaguaretama.
It is the largest multiple-use public reservoir in Brazil and the largest dam in Brazil on an intermittent river.

The dam includes a hydroelectric power plant with a capacity of 22.5 MW.

From Itaiçaba the water follows the Canal do Trabalhador to the state capital.

Construction

The Jaguaribe River used to be called the largest seasonal river in the world.
The  river is the largest in Ceará.
Before the dam was built the Orós Dam on the Jaguaribe River was the largest in the state, but it has just over half the capacity of the Castanhão.
The idea of building the Castanhão Dam came from the Cunha family, who led the region's oligarchy at the time.
They owned the Castanhão farm, which is now almost completely submerged by the reservoir.

The Castanhão Dam was one of the most important projects of DNOCS (National Department of Drought Works).
Work was started in 1995 under the government of Tasso Jereissati.
Construction was done by a partnership between DNOCS and the Ceará Secretariat of Water Resources.
It was concluded on 23 December 2002 under governor Beni Veras.
The dam was officially opened on 29 January 2004.
The reservoir reached 97% of its capacity in the 2009 rainy season, covering .

Impact

The dam was controversial, forcing relocation of thousands of people and relocation of the municipal seat of Jaguaribara.
The Castanhão Ecological Station was created in compensation for the environmental impact.
The municipal seat of Jaguaribara and large areas of the municipality  were covered by the reservoir.
A new seat, Nova Jaguaribara, was built, but as of 2016 there were still outstanding claims for indemnification of lost land.

The giant dam supplies water to the Metropolitan Region of Fortaleza and supports irrigation and the industries of Pecém.
It supplies about 3.8 million people in greater Fortaleza.
The reservoir has 37% of the state's water storage capacity.
It controls the level of the Jaguaribe River, preventing floods and ensuring a constant flow year round.
The reservoir is a tourist attraction.
With its submerged city, it is of great interest to divers.

2012–18 drought

From 2012 to 2016 Ceará experienced the worst drought since 1910, with just  of rain.
At the end of 2012, the first year of low rainfall, the reservoir had , or 55.61% of its capacity.
Fish farmers said they could only continue farming tilapia until the end of the year.

The low water levels in 2014 revealed a crack in the structure of one of the floodgates.
As of mid-2016 nothing had been done to repair it.
By December 2016 the reservoir had fallen to 5.17% of capacity, the lowest level since the reservoir filled in 2004.
As of 14 January 2017 the rains from the start of the rainy season had not yet started to replenish the reservoir, which was at 4.99% of total capacity.
As of 22 February 2018 the reservoir was at 2,08 %. Rain returned in Ceará in February 2018 and on 13 May Castanhão has reached 8,68 % of its capacity. But on 4 October it was down again - 6,06 % only.

References

External links

Dams in Ceará